Baron Holand is a title in the Peerage of England. It was created twice, in 1314 and 1353. The first creation was extinguished by attainder and the second is in abeyance.

Barons Holand, First Creation (1314)

Robert de Holland, 1st Baron Holand (1290–1328)
Robert de Holland, 2nd Baron Holand (1312–1373)
Maud Lovel, 3rd Baroness Holand (1356 – c. 1420)
William Lovel, 4th Baron Holand and 7th Baron Lovel (1397–1454)
John Lovel, 5th Baron Holand and 8th Baron Lovel (1432–1465)
Francis Lovel, 6th Baron Holand, 9th Baron Lovel and 1st Viscount Lovel (1456–1487), created Viscount Lovel 1483, titles forfeit 1485

Barons Holand, Second Creation (1354)
See Earl of Kent, 1360 creation

References

1314 establishments in England
Abeyant baronies in the Peerage of England
Forfeited baronies in the Peerage of England
Noble titles created in 1314
Noble titles created in 1354